Joe Loth (born January 17, 1967) is head football coach for Western Connecticut State University in Danbury, Connecticut. He has two sons named Zachary and Tyler, and his wife is named Keri.

In eight seasons as head football coach for Otterbein University, his previous head coaching job, he compiled a record of 46–35, including a 7–3 (6–3 OAC) record in 2005—the first winning season for Otterbein since 1999 and only the second since 1982. That year they also beat their rival, Capital University, who had qualified for the NCAA Division III playoffs. He has the highest winning percentage in Otterbein history for any coach who has coached at least three seasons. The Cardinals finished second in the OAC in 2009, 8–2 overall and 7–2. In 2008 they went 9–2 overall and 8–1 in the OAC. They advanced to the NCAA Division III Football Playoffs for the first time in school history. Loth was named "OAC Football Coach of the Year" for the second time in his career and was named Ohio Division III Coach of the Year by OhioFootball.Com.

In the summer of 2009, Loth worked with the wide receivers as a guest coach for the Saskatchewan Roughriders, who advanced to the 2009 Grey Cup in the Canadian Football League.

Loth played college football at Otterbein from 1987 to 1990, lettering all four seasons and a starter for three. In his senior season he garnered Ohio Athletic Conference Second Team honors and is still the school's all-time leader in interceptions (13).

Head coaching record

References

External links
 Western Connecticut State profile

1967 births
Living people
American football defensive backs
Capital Comets football coaches
Kean Cougars football coaches
Otterbein Cardinals football coaches
Otterbein Cardinals football players
Rhode Island Rams football coaches
SMU Mustangs football coaches
Western Connecticut State Colonials football coaches
Saskatchewan Roughriders coaches
Southern Methodist University alumni
People from Painesville, Ohio